Robert Blyth, OSB (b Norton, Derbyshire 1470 - d Cambridge 1547) was a Bishop of Down and Connor in the first half of the sixteenth century.

Also the Abbot of Thorney Abbey, he was first appointed  on 16 April 1520; but accepted royal supremacy in 1539. He was deposed by Pope Paul III. Blyth also  acted as a suffragan bishop in the Diocese of Ely from 1539 to 1541.

References

16th-century Anglican bishops in Ireland
Bishops of Down and Connor
1547 deaths
1470 births
People from Norton Lees
Benedictine abbots